Jean-Paul Beaulieu (January 22, 1902 – November 14, 1976) was a Canadian and Québécois politician and chartered accountant.

Background

He was born on January 22, 1902, in Saint-Paul-de-l'Île-aux-Noix, Montérégie. He studied at the Université de Montréal and McGill University. He obtained a license degree in commercial sciences from McGill. He has received honorary doctorates from Université Laval and Université de Montréal

Member of the legislature

Beaulieu won a by-election in 1941 and became the Union Nationale Member of the Legislative Assembly of Quebec for the provincial electoral district of Saint-Jean–Napierville.  He was re-elected in the district of Saint-Jean in the 1944, 1948, 1952 and 1956 elections.

He was appointed to the Cabinet in 1944 and served as Minister of Trade and Commerce, until his defeated in the 1960 election.  He was defeated again in the 1962 election.

Federal politics

He was elected to the House of Commons of Canada as a Member of the Progressive Conservative Party to represent the riding of Saint-Jean—Iberville—Napierville in the 1965 federal election. He lost in the 1968 election.

Death

Beaulieu died on November 14, 1976.

References

1902 births
1976 deaths
Members of the House of Commons of Canada from Quebec
Progressive Conservative Party of Canada MPs
Union Nationale (Quebec) MNAs
McGill University alumni
Université de Montréal alumni